A Family is a 2017 Italian drama film directed by . It was screened in the main competition section of the 74th Venice International Film Festival.

Cast
 Micaela Ramazzotti as Maria
 Patrick Bruel as Vincenzo
 Fortunato Cerlino as Dr. Minerva
 Marco Leonardi as Pietro
 Matilda De Angelis as Stella
 Ennio Fantastichini as Giorgio

Reception

Critical response
On review aggregator website Metacritic, which assigns a normalized rating to reviews, the film has a weighted average score of 31 out of 100, based on 4 critics, indicating "generally unfavorable reviews."

References

External links
 

2017 films
2017 drama films
Italian drama films
2010s Italian-language films
Films about surrogacy
2010s Italian films
Italian pregnancy films